The Queen Victoria Gardens are Melbourne's memorial to Queen Victoria. Located on 4.8 hectares (12 acres) opposite the Victorian Arts Centre and National Gallery of Victoria, bounded by St Kilda Road, Alexandra Avenue and Linlithgow Avenue.

Queen Victoria's reign started in 1837, two years after the initial European settlement of Melbourne, and upon her death in 1901 it was thought appropriate to declare an enduring monument to her reign. A memorial statue was commissioned from sculptor James White showing the Queen in ceremonial gowns casting her regal gaze across ornamental lakes, sweeping lawns and rose gardens to the Melbourne Arts Centre Spire and the city skyscrapers.

Queen Victoria Gardens are part of a larger group of parklands directly south-east of the city, between St Kilda Road and the Yarra River known as the Domain Parklands, which includes;
 Royal Botanic Gardens
 Kings Domain
 Alexandra Gardens
Queen Victoria Gardens

Features
A huge floral clock is positioned opposite the National Gallery of Victoria, containing over 7,000 flowering plants which are changed twice yearly. The clock was donated in 1966 to the City of Melbourne by a group of Swiss watchmakers. Behind the clock stands a bronze equestrian statue, a memorial to Queen Victoria's successor, King Edward VII. The statue, by Melbourne born sculptor Bertram Mackennal, was unveiled on 21 July 1920.

Queen Victoria Memorial
A granite and marble memorial, commissioned by public subscription from sculptor James White and positioned at the highest point of the gardens, commemorates five aspects of Queen Victoria. The memorial is of white Carrara marble, Harcourt granite and NSW Caloola marble, and was unveiled by Sir John Madden on Empire Day, 24 May 1907.

Originally home to native grasses, she-oaks, wattles, paperbarks, and river red gums, the area now consists of ornamental lakes, sweeping lawns, flowerbeds of annuals, and mature European and Australian trees and shrubs in a landscaped garden.

As well as the monuments to Queen Victoria and King Edward VII, the gardens are notable for their array of sculptures. These include an exploratory play sculpture for children, The Genie,  by Tom Bass in 1973. The Pathfinder was manufactured in 1974 by John Robinson and details a bronze Olympic Hammer thrower in action. The Phoenix was sculptured from cast bronze and welded copper sheet by Baroness Yrsa Von Heistner in 1973 to commemorate the 40th International Eucharistic Congress. The Bronze Water Children is an installation by John Robinson, made in 1973, which shows playing children at the top of a stream. The Water Nymph is a kneeling bronze figure sculptured in 1925 by Paul Montford, modelled on Eileen Lillian Prescott.

A classic rotunda was built in 1913 and named after Janet, Lady Clarke, a philanthropist who worked for the welfare of women in Melbourne.

See also
MPavilion

References

External links

 Melbourne City Council - Queen Victoria Gardens
 Queen Victoria Memorial (including photographs)

Parks in Melbourne
Gardens in Victoria (Australia)
Monuments and memorials to Queen Victoria
1905 establishments in Australia
1907 sculptures
Landmarks in Melbourne
City of Melbourne